Saint-Ghislain is a city and municipality of Wallonia located in the province of Hainaut, Belgium. 

On 1 January 2018 the municipality had 23,335 inhabitants.

The municipality consists of the following districts: Baudour, Hautrage, Neufmaison, Saint-Ghislain, Sirault, Tertre et Villerot.

History
The town is named after Saint Ghislain. In the 7th century, with two unknown disciples Ghislain made a clearing in the vicinity of Castrilocus (now Mons), later taking up his abode at a place called Ursidongus, where he built an oratory or chapel dedicated to Saints Peter and Paul.  Ursidongus was later named after him.

Economy
Google chose Saint-Ghislain in 2007 to host its new major European datacenter.

People born in Saint-Ghislain

 Johannes Ockeghem, composer (between 1410 and 1425)

References

External links
 

Cities in Wallonia
Municipalities of Hainaut (province)